8 and 9 Bentinck Street are adjacent grade II listed terraced houses in Bentinck Street, in the City of Westminster, London. Number 8 was completed around 1780, and number 9 in 1780–90. A blue plaque notes the fact that James Smithson, founder of the Smithsonian Institution, once lived at number 9.

References

External links 

Grade II listed houses in the City of Westminster
Residential buildings completed in 1780
Buildings and structures in Marylebone